The 2007 Teen Choice Awards ceremony was held on August 26, 2007, at the Gibson Amphitheatre, Universal City, California. The event was hosted by Hilary Duff and Nick Cannon with Kelly Clarkson, Avril Lavigne, Fergie, and Shop Boyz as performers. Justin Timberlake received the Ultimate Choice Award.

Performers
Avril Lavigne – "Girlfriend"
Kelly Clarkson – "Never Again"
Fergie – "Big Girls Don't Cry"
Shop Boyz – "Party Like a Rockstar"

Presenters
Megan Fox and Dwayne Johnson • Presented Choice Comedy TV Actor
Ryan Reynolds and Nikki Blonsky • Presented Choice Breakout Movie Actor
Jonas Brothers and Miley Cyrus • Presented Choice R&B Track
Sum 41 • Introduced Avril Lavigne
Jared Padalecki • Presented Choice TV Movie
Eve and David Spade • Presented Choice Movie Hissy Fit
Ashley Jensen and America Ferrera • Presented Choice Male Hottie and Choice Female Hottie
David Boreanaz and Emily Deschanel • Introduced Kelly Clarkson
Michael Cera, Jonah Hill, and Christopher Mintz-Plasse • Presented Ultimate Choice
Jason Lee and Justin Long • Presented Choice Comedian
Apolo Anton Ohno and Jordin Sparks • Presented Choice V-Cast Video
Chingy, Ludacris, and Greg Oden • Presented Choice Comedy Movie Actress
Adrianne Palicki and Taylor Kitsch • Presented Choice Comedy TV Actress
Keke Palmer and Emmy Rossum • Introduced Fergie
Jessica Alba and Dane Cook • Presented Choice Summer Movie: Comedy
Bow Wow and Omarion • Presented Choice Action Movie
Ashlee Simpson • Presented Choice Summer TV Show

Winners and nominees
Winners are listed first and highlighted in bold text.

Movies

Television

Music

Miscellaneous

References

2007
2007 awards
2007 in American music
2007 in California
2000s in Los Angeles
August 2007 events